Zlin Aircraft a.s. (former well known name Moravan Otrokovice) is a Czech aircraft company. It is located at the Zlín Airfield on the outskirts of Otrokovice. It is known for the line of Z-26 Trener and other small aircraft like crop-dusting Z-37 and aerobatics special Z-50.

History

Zlínská letecká společnost, a. s. (1934–1938)
Founded in 1934 as Zlínská letecká společnost, a. s. (Zlín Aviation company), by Zlín-based company Baťa, it started to produce glider and single engine aircraft trainers.  Later production expanded to segments of sport and agriculture aircraft. Trainer Z-XII became the most popular type of the era.

Zlínské letecké závody, a.s. (1938–1945)
During the German occupation of Czechoslovakia, the factory was known as Zlínské letecké závody, a.s. (Zlin Aviation Works JSC). It produced German trainer types Klemm Kl 35, after the war known as C-1 in Czechoslovakia, and a low-wing Bücker Bü 181 which was later produced as Z-181 (military designation C-6).

Zlínavion (1945–1952)
After WWII, the company was nationalised and used its official name Zlínské letecké závody, a.s. v národní správě (Zlín Aviation Works JSC under National Administration) and later on, it was incorporated to the Automobilové závody, národní podnik (Automotive Works, National Enterprise) as its Otrokovice Plant using its new trade name Zlínavion. In mid-Sept 1948, the factory became a part of newly established Let, národní podnik (seated in Prague) as its Plant No.7 in Otrokovice (nominally merged with Zlin and renamed to Gottwaldov on 1 January 1949).

Moravan, n.p. (1953–1989)
In 1953 a new name Moravan, was adopted and marked the beginning of the most famous period for the company.
Series of Z-26 Trener were produced in the 1960s and 70s in large numbers for domestic civil and military use as well as export to both eastern and western customers. The type was one of the most popular for modern aerobatics competitions and it contributed to definition of high performance aerobatics specials. Other Zlin aircraft from the time are crop-dusting Z-37 Čmelák, Reliable all-metal trainers, two seat Z-42/142 and four seat Z-43 and a new aerobatics special Z-50 which was a next generation aerobatics type replacing the Z-26 series in competitions.

Moravan a.s. (1990-2006)
The state enterprise was transformed to a joint-stock company after the fall of the Communist regime. It continued in production of the Z-42 and Z-43 series but the sales were rapidly falling and the sales network became disorganized as the company organization did not adapt to the market changes from centrally organized eastern markets to the free competition. Also the aircraft design was outdated (mainly engines) and the company could not find customers for its specific advantages (reliability and simple maintenance). The company suffered financial problems in 2002, it was renamed Moravan-Aeroplanes a.s. and it continued production of upgraded variants of Z-242L and Z-143L with improved wing design and Lycoming engines. It also prepared the Z-143Lsi variant with fuel injection engine. However, the financial situation became even worse and the company declared bankruptcy in 2005. In December 2006, the company was taken over by CzechAircraft, s. r. o. owned by Irish QucomHaps Holding Ltd. represented by Billy Harkin and renamed Moravan Aviation s.r.o.

Moravan Aviation s.r.o. (2006–2010)
The production line has not changed and the backbone of the company activities were Z-143L and Z-242L, followed by the finally certified variant of Z-143LSi. The business was also extended with sub-deliveries to other aircraft factories in the Czech Republic like Aero Vodochody and LET Aircraft Industries. But the revival was short-lived and the famed company was closed due to long-term poor financial results and management in March 2010.

Zlin Aircraft a.s. (2009–present)
Zlin Aircraft a.s. was founded in July 2009 with a goal to take over the production of the Zlin aircraft. It bought all the rights to manufacture the current line of the Z-143L, Z-242L and Z-143Lsi as well as buildings, materials and personnel from Moravan Aviation. The company possesses all necessary certificates issued either by EASA or by local State authorities and/or ministries. Another notable activity is maintenance and overhauls of the Zlin aircraft which are still very popular.

Products

Aircraft

Engines
 Persy I
 Persy II
 Persy III
 Toma 4
 Toma 6

See also
 Aero Vodochody
 Avia
 Beneš-Mráz
 Let Kunovice
 Letov Kbely
 Skyleader

References

Notes

Bibliography

External links

 ZLIN AIRCRAFT a.s. - official site
 Zlin history on www.palba.cz part 1, part 2 (Czech)
 ZLÍN-AVION Service - popular ZLIN types maintenance company located in Otrokovice
 Zlin Aviation s.r.o. - another not-related company producing Italian Piper Cub replica "Savage".
 Zlín Aviation Joint Stock Company – Helicopters in Czechia 

Bata Corporation
Aircraft manufacturers of the Czech Republic and Czechoslovakia
Czech brands